In integral calculus, integration by reduction formulae is a method relying on recurrence relations. It is used when an expression containing an integer parameter, usually in the form of powers of elementary functions, or products of transcendental functions and polynomials of arbitrary degree, can't be integrated directly. But using other methods of integration a reduction formula can be set up to obtain the integral of the same or similar expression with a lower integer parameter, progressively simplifying the integral until it can be evaluated.  This method of integration is one of the earliest used.

How to find the reduction formula 

The reduction formula can be derived using any of the common methods of integration, like integration by substitution, integration by parts, integration by trigonometric substitution, integration by partial fractions, etc. The main idea is to express an integral involving an integer parameter (e.g. power) of a function, represented by In, in terms of an integral that involves a lower value of the parameter (lower power) of that function, for example In-1 or In-2. This makes the reduction formula a type of recurrence relation. In other words, the reduction formula expresses the integral 
 
in terms of 
 
where

How to compute the integral 

To compute the integral, we set n to its value and use the reduction formula to express it in terms of the (n – 1) or (n – 2) integral. The lower index integral can be used to calculate the higher index ones; the process is continued repeatedly until we reach a point where the function to be integrated can be computed, usually when its index is 0 or 1. Then we back-substitute the previous results until we have computed In.

Examples 

Below are examples of the procedure.

Cosine integral 
Typically, integrals like 

can be evaluated by a reduction formula. 

Start by setting:

Now re-write as:

Integrating by this substitution:

Now integrating by parts:

solving for In:

so the reduction formula is:

To supplement the example, the above can be used to evaluate the integral for (say) n = 5;

Calculating lower indices:

back-substituting:

where C is a constant.

Exponential integral 
Another typical example is:

Start by setting:

Integrating by substitution:

Now integrating by parts:

shifting indices back by 1 (so n + 1 → n, n → n – 1):

solving for In:

so the reduction formula is:

An alternative way in which the derivation could be done starts by substituting .

Integration by substitution:

Now integrating by parts:

which gives the reduction formula when substituting back:

which is equivalent to:

Another alternative way in which the derivation could be done by integrating by parts:

Remember:

which gives the reduction formula when substituting back:

which is equivalent to:

Tables of integral reduction formulas

Rational functions

The following integrals contain:
Factors of the linear radical 
Linear factors  and the linear radical 
Quadratic factors 
Quadratic factors , for 
Quadratic factors , for 
(Irreducible) quadratic factors 
Radicals of irreducible quadratic factors 

note that by the laws of indices:

Transcendental functions

The following integrals contain:
Factors of sine
Factors of cosine
Factors of sine and cosine products and quotients
Products/quotients of exponential factors and powers of x
Products of exponential and sine/cosine factors

References

Bibliography

Anton, Bivens, Davis, Calculus, 7th edition.

Integral calculus